TLE is a TLA that may stand for:

Arts and entertainment
The Living End, an Australian band formed in 1994
Star Trek: The Lost Era, a novel series in the Star Trek franchise
Lost Experience, a game based on the Lost television series

Medicine
Temporal lobe epilepsy, the most common form of focal seizure, originating in the temporal lobe of the brain

Science and technology
Kimber Custom TLE II, a model of the Kimber Custom handgun
Temporal light effects, wanted or unwanted effects caused by light modulations
Total lunar eclipse, an astronomical event
Transient luminous event, or upper-atmospheric lightning, a weather phenomenon
Two-line element set, a format for distributing orbital element data

Other uses
Technology and Livelihood Education, part of an educational curriculum in the Philippines
The London Economic, a left-wing digital newspaper based in the UK